Onchidella flavescens is a species of small, air-breathing sea slugs, shell-less marine pulmonate gastropod molluscs in the family Onchidiidae.

References

Onchidiidae
Gastropods of New Zealand
Gastropods described in 1904